The Chencholai bombing (also spelled Sencholai) took place on August 14, 2006 when the Sri Lankan Air Force bombed what it said was a rebel Liberation Tigers of Tamil Eelam (LTTE) training camp, killing 61 girls aged 16 to 18. The LTTE, UNICEF, the Sri Lanka Monitoring Mission and UTHR all said those in the compound were not LTTE cadres.

Incident and reactions
The Sri Lankan government claimed to have been monitoring the site since 2004, that it was a training camp and clearly was not a mistaken or wrong target.

The Tamil Nadu state assembly in India passed a resolution termed the Chencholai orphanage bombing   as 'uncivilized, barbaric, inhumane and atrocious'.

The human rights organisation University reported that LTTE had organized this first aid class and that these children were not Child Soldiers. It further claimed that this camp was used by LTTE but not as a training camp.

A United Nations spokeswoman, Orla Clinton, said that students had been killed in the attack and seem to have been students between 16 and 18, A-level students, from the Kilinochichi and Mullaittivu areas, who were on a two-day training course.

The Tamil National Alliance condemned the airstrike: "This attack is not merely atrocious and inhuman - it clearly has a genocidal intent. It is yet another instance of brazen state terrorism,”

UNICEF
UNICEF staff from a nearby office immediately visited the compound to assess the situation and to provide fuel and supplies for the hospital as well as counselling support for the injured students and the bereaved families. Ann M. Veneman, UNICEF Executive Director, stated, "These children are innocent victims of violence". UNICEF's Joanne Van Gerpen stated, "At this time, we don't have any evidence that they are LTTE cadres".

SLMM
A retired major general of the Swedish Army, Ulf Henricsson, was the head of the Nordic truce monitors SLMM and said that his staff had not finished counting the dead and that they could not find any sign of military installations or weapons.

Victims
The Director of Education for Kilinochchi district, T. Kurukularajah, and the Director of Education for Mullaitivu district, P. Ariyaratnam, confirmed the school girls' names.

Sri Lanka government 
The Sri Lanka government spokesmen Keheliya Rambukwela and Brigadier Athula Jayawardene told the media in Colombo that the orphanage had in fact been a training and transit camp for the LTTE's military cadres. The camp, Jayawardene pointed out, did not look like an orphanage at all or any other civilian structure for that matter. Rambukwela and Jayawardene argued that even if the victims were minors (under 18 years of age) and girls, they were soldiers or soldiers under training. The Sri Lankan refused to condemn the incident or to order any inquiry. The government also showed journalists, as Reuters reported, what appeared to be satellite footage of Tigers fleeing a training camp shortly after Kfir jets had bombed it. 

However, a journalist who viewed the tapes stated:  

On September 1, Sri Lankan police said they arrested three young women, aged 18, 19 and 20, who they said were injured in the airstrike and were subsequently brought to a hospital in central Sri Lanka for treatment. Inspector General of Police Chandra Fernando said the three young women all claimed that they were taken by a member of the Tamil Tigers to a camp deep within rebel territory for first aid training, but when they reached the camp, they were forced to undergo weapons training.
A Sri Lankan commission of inquiry was headed by Justice Udalagama to investigate 16 high-profile human rights cases but could finish only 7 cases before it had been disbanded and exonerated the government  based on statements of the  three arrested girls one of whom came before the commission and other from hospital ,the third girl died.

North East Secretariat on Human Rights statement
In the Senchcholai complex in Vallipunam in the Mullaithivu district hundreds of female students from 17 to 20 were gathered on 10 August 2006 for a weeklong training in leadership and first aid, which was intended for preparing the students for leadership in their school and community during the impending war.

On 14 August 2006, around 7.30am, Sri Lankan Air Force carried out extensive bombing. 52 students and two staff were killed, and 130 students were seriously injured. Many more received minor injuries. Three of the injured girls lost one leg  and another girl lost an eye.

A further three of the injured girls were sent by the Mullaithivu hospital to Kandy for treatment. Sri Lankan Terrorism Investigation Department (TID) immediately put the three injured girls under arrest. The three girls were eventually cleared and were brought to Vavuniya hospital to return to their homes in Vanni when one of the injured girls, Thambimuttu Thayalini, died. The other two girls  were immediately taken back Kandy hospital. Eventually, the whereabouts of the two girls, Kasthuri Sripathy and Sumithra Balasingham, became mysterious except that their parents were permitted to meet the girls at prearranged locations. The parents of the girls remained at a loss as to the detention of the two girls without charges for almost two years.

References

External links 

Air-strike victims photos
NESHOR Press release

Aerial bombing in Sri Lanka
Attacks on civilians attributed to the Sri Lanka Air Force
Massacres in Sri Lanka
Mass murder in 2006
Mass murder of Sri Lankan Tamils
Massacres of women
Sri Lankan government forces attacks in Eelam War IV
Terrorist incidents in Sri Lanka in 2006
Crimes against children
School bombings
School massacres
Violence against Indigenous women
Violence against women in Sri Lanka